Klaus Nord Hoel (1865–1923) was a Norwegian civil servant and politician.  He served as the last Diocesan Governor of Tromsø stiftamt from 1915 until its dissolution on 31 Dec 1918. He simultaneously served as the County Governor of Troms county from 1915 until his retirement in 1920.

References

1865 births
1923 deaths
County governors of Norway